Moses Point Army Airfield is a former United States Army airfield located in Elim, a city in the Nome Census Area of the U.S. state of Alaska.

See also
 Alaska World War II Army Airfields
 Air Transport Command
 Northwest Staging Route

References

Airfields of the United States Army Air Forces in Alaska
Airports in the Nome Census Area, Alaska
Closed installations of the United States Army